His Illustrious Highness Prince Nicholas Tchkotoua (1909-1984) was a Georgian writer and a prominent member of the Order of Malta. He fled his homeland after the takeover by the Bolsheviks in 1921.

United States
Tchkotoua was educated in France and Switzerland and settled in the US in 1933, where he met and married Carol Marmon, only daughter of Howard Carpenter Marmon (creator of the Marmon Wasp) whilst at the Marmon Motor Car Company).

In 1949, Tchkotoua published a novel he wrote in English, claimed as the first-ever internationally published novel written by a Georgian. In the novel, set in Tbilisi, Lausanne and Paris before the First World War, Georgian Prince Shota's love for his Taya, a Russian princess, remains faithful even when outside forces manipulate their emotions, prise them apart and Shota ends up betrothed to an American. But it is the emotion, rather than the betrothal, that concerns the author. A new, re-edited version of the novel was published in 2008 to some acclaim.

Death-wish
Tchkotoua and his family later moved to Lausanne, Switzerland, where he died in 1984.
Tchkotoua asked that after his death his heart be buried in Georgia. In 1988 his family smuggled it back to the cemetery in Vera, Tbilisi, where it lies to this day.

References

1909 births
1984 deaths
Novelists from Georgia (country)
Russian nobility
20th-century novelists
People from Lausanne